Elena Vyacheslavovna Mukhina (first name sometimes rendered "Yelena", last name sometimes rendered "Muchina"; 1 June 196022 December 2006) was a Soviet gymnast who won the all-around title at the 1978 World Championships in Strasbourg, France. Her career was on the rise, and she was widely touted as the next great gymnastics star until 1979, when she broke a leg and missed several competitions. The rushed recovery from that injury, combined with pressure to master a dangerous and difficult tumbling move (the Thomas salto) caused her to break her neck two weeks before the opening of the 1980 Summer Olympics, leaving her permanently quadriplegic.

Early life
Elena Mukhina was born 1 June 1960, in Moscow, Russian SFSR. Both her parents died when she was five years old. She was raised by her grandmother, Anna Ivanovna, who later died.

Career
Mukhina took an interest in gymnastics and figure skating at an early age. When an athletic scout visited her school, she eagerly volunteered to try out for gymnastics. She later joined the CSKA Moscow ("Central Red Army") sports club. In recognition of her accomplishments, Mukhina was inducted into the CSKA Hall of Fame.

Up until 1975, Mukhina was an unremarkable gymnast, and Soviet coaches largely ignored her. Then, two separate incidents brought her skills to the forefront for the Soviet team: Romanian domination of the Soviet gymnastics machine at the 1976 Olympics (for which the director for Soviet women's gymnastics, Larisa Latynina, was blamed; Latynina's response was, "it's not my fault that Nadia Comăneci was born in Romania"); and Mukhina's transition to working with men's coach , who transformed her into one of the most show-stopping gymnasts of her time. She burst onto the scene at the 1978 World Championships in Strasbourg, France. In one of the most stunning all-around performances in history, she won the gold medal, beating Olympic Champions Nadia Comăneci and top-ranked Soviet gymnast Nellie Kim, among others. She also tied for the gold medal in the floor exercise event final, as well as winning the silver in balance beam and uneven bars. She made history in this competition by unveiling her signature moves: a full-twisting layout Korbut flip on bars; a tucked double back salto dismount on beam (a move that is still being used over three decades later); and a full-twisting double back somersault on floor (still an E-rated move in the Code of Points) dubbed the "Muchina". Yet, in spite of these innovations, Mukhina maintained the classic Soviet style, inspired by ballet movements and expressive lines. She quickly established herself as an athlete to watch for at the 1980 Summer Olympics in Moscow.

A documentary film of the Soviet national team (1978) features Mukhina talking with her coach, Mikhail Klimenko, and footage of her rigorous training regimen.

Injury
Mukhina's floor exercise tumbling passes were considered revolutionary at the time because they included a never-before seen combination salto (the "Muchina"), but in 1979, her coach wanted her to become one of the few female gymnasts doing an element taken from men's gymnastics, the Thomas salto (a 1½ backflip with 1½ twists ending in a forward roll, perfected by American gymnast Kurt Thomas). Even though she won the All Around title and floor exercises at the 1978 world championship with daring bar routines, a revolutionary balance beam dismount, and a floor routine with its own signature move, she was pressured to add this element to her floor exercises by her own coach and other higher-ranking Soviet coaches. Mukhina soon realized the Thomas salto was extremely dangerous because it depended on being able to get enough height and speed to make all the flips and mid-air twists and still land in-bounds with enough room to do the forward roll, and it took near-perfect timing to avoid either under-rotation (and landing on the chin) or over-rotation (and landing on the back of the head). In the 1991 documentary More than a Game, Mukhina spoke of trying to convince her coach that the Thomas salto was a dangerous element:

In 1979, while training for the 1979 World Artistic Gymnastics Championships, Mukhina suffered a broken leg, which kept her out of the World Championships in Fort Worth, Texas, a competition in which the Soviet team suffered its first defeat at the hands of their archrivals from Romania, with only Nellie Kim and Stella Zakharova able to medal in apparatus and All Around disciplines. With less than a year until the 1980 Summer Olympics to be held in Moscow, the pressure was on the Soviet team coaches and doctors to get the previous All Around champion Mukhina back on her feet and ready for the games. In an interview with Ogonyok magazine, Mukhina blamed the doctors at TsITO (Central Institute of Traumatology and Orthopedics), who were serving the National Team for attempting to rush her back into training too soon, saying she begged them not to remove her cast and discharge her because "they're dragging me from home to workouts," and she knew she was not yet healed. When doctors removed her cast against her wishes and had her try walking on the leg, she said that she knew she was walking "crookedly", and that something was not right. The TsITO doctors X-rayed the leg, and discovered that the fracture had not healed properly. Mukhina was rushed into surgery that afternoon, but the damage had already been done to her reputation; one of the National Team coaches, she said in the Ogonyok interview, showed up at her bed the day after surgery, and outright stated that she "wasn't conscientious", and that she could still "train in a cast". Once more against her wishes, the doctors removed her cast prematurely, and Mukhina returned to training for the Olympics while beginning a strenuous workout program at CSKA Moscow to lose the weight she had gained while laid up from surgery.

With lingering weakness in her leg, and mounting exhaustion from the grueling weight loss workouts, Mukhina had great difficulty coming back up to speed on what was to be the new end element of one of her floor exercise tumbling passes, the Thomas salto. Despite Mukhina's warnings that the element was constantly causing minor injuries, and was dangerous enough to potentially cause major injuries, she was pushed to keep the element in her floor routine, and she continued to practice it, even knowing it was a dangerous element. On 3 July 1980, two weeks before the Moscow Olympics, Mukhina was practising the pass containing the Thomas salto when she under-rotated the salto, and crash-landed on her chin, snapping her spine and leaving her quadriplegic. Mukhina was training at the Minsk Palace of Sport when the injury occurred; her coach Klimenko was not present. The Soviet Union awarded her Order of the Badge of Honour in 1980 in response to her injury, and then in 1982 or 1983, Juan Samaranch, the IOC President, awarded her the Silver Medal of the Olympic Order.

Following the injury, the Soviet Gymnastics Federation remained secretive about the events surrounding Mukhina's injury, with Soviet team coach Yuri Titov deflecting inquiries about whether she would be trying for a comeback in 1984, even blaming Mukhina's "injury" on attempting a skill that she "was not able to do but thought she needed to make the team[...]she suffered injury and missed her chance.[...]All the bad stories, they are not true." Information emerged only slowly. Initial rumors were that she had fallen on approach to the vault, then Soviet newspapers reported she had fallen during her dismount from the balance beam, and had a blackout, but then got back up to finish her floor exercise without knowing how badly she had been injured. Finally, word emerged that she had fallen catastrophically during the floor exercise. Mukhina became a recluse following the accident, and rarely discussed it publicly. In one of her few interviews about the accident, published in Ogonyok magazine, she criticized the Soviet gymnastics program for deceiving the public about her injury, and for the system's insatiable desire for gold medals and championships:

Despite this, Mukhina took some of the responsibility for not saying no to protect herself from further harm, and noted that her first thought as she lay on the floor with her neck severely broken was, "Thank God, I won't be going to the Olympics."

Aftermath
According to Larisa Latynina's 2004 interview, Mukhina's trainer, Mikhail Klimenko, was affected by her injury. Because of her devastating injury, Mukhina could not be added to the 1980 Soviet Olympic team roster. There was little doubt that the Soviet Olympic women's gymnastics team would get the gold medal in the team competition at the 1980 Summer Olympics, as it had at all previous Olympics. Nevertheless, Klimenko had desperately wanted Mukhina to make the Olympic team roster because he wanted to become the "Olympic champion's trainer." Soon after Mukhina's paralytic injury, Klimenko emigrated to Italy, where he lived with his children until his death from cancer on 14 November 2007, his 65th birthday.

After Mukhina's paralysis and several other close calls with other Olympic-eligible female gymnasts, the Thomas salto was removed from the Code of Points as an allowed skill for women.  It remained an allowed skill for men as of 2013, but as of the 2017–2020 quad, rollout skills were banned for both men and women.

Mukhina was a guest columnist for Moscow News in the late 1980s. Her injury was a featured topic in the 1991 A&E documentary More Than a Game; and her World Championship performance is captured in the ABC Sports video Gymnastics' Greatest Stars. Mukhina took a keen interest in children and young gymnasts both before and after her injury. She also expressed a deep religious faith, and was fond of horses and animated cartoons. Mukhina was thankful to her former teammates who kept in touch with her, especially Yelena Davydova, whom she described as "A real friend".

Elena was cared for by her grandmother and, following her death, by Elena Gurina the former gymnast.

In late July 2021, many people compared Mukhina with Simone Biles, in defense of Biles' decision to pull out of the 2020 Tokyo Olympics while citing health concerns.

Death

As a tribute, sports magazine Sovetsky Sport dedicated the cover of its Christmas 2006 issue to her. A memorial service was held in her honor on 27 December, and she was buried at the Troekourov Cemetery in Moscow.

Achievements

Eponymous skills
Mukhina has two eponymous skills listed in the Code of Points.

See also

 Yelena Shushunova, a Russian gymnast who executed the Thomas Salto in the 1987 European Gymnastics Championships
 Julissa Gomez, an American gymnast paralyzed in a vaulting accident at a 1988 meet in Japan while attempting the difficult-to-master Yurchenko vault. She later died of her injury.
 Christy Henrich, an American gymnast who was told by an international gymnastics judge in 1989 to lose weight and pushed by coaches to lose weight while continuing to train until constant dieting led to her eventual death from complications of anorexia nervosa less than five years later.
 Sang Lan, a Chinese gymnast paralyzed from the chest down after crashing a vault timer at the 1998 Goodwill Games in New York. She advocates for disabled people in China. A Chinese miniseries was produced about her life, starring fellow gymnast Mo Huilan.

References

External links
 
 
 Elena Mukhina at Gymn Forum
  of Mukhina in her prime, Chinese female gymnast He Xuemei doing the Thomas salto at the 1992 Summer Olympics, and other famous gymnasts whose careers were cut short by injuries or illnesses
 , which includes much archive footage of her competition performances and her training sessions.

1960 births
2006 deaths
Gymnasts from Moscow
Soviet female artistic gymnasts
Russian female artistic gymnasts
World champion gymnasts
Medalists at the World Artistic Gymnastics Championships
People with tetraplegia
Burials in Troyekurovskoye Cemetery
Originators of elements in artistic gymnastics
European champions in gymnastics